Stenidea annulicornis is a species of beetle in the family Cerambycidae. It was described by Brullé in 1838, originally under the genus Cerambyx. It is known from the Canary Islands.

References

annulicornis
Beetles described in 1838